.cy is the country code top-level domain (ccTLD) for Cyprus. Some restrictions exist for various subdomains, but .com.cy is unrestricted to Cypriot entities.

Second level domains

 ac.cy  – Academic and research institutions.
 net.cy  – Internet or Network service providers.
 gov.cy  – Governmental institutions.
 org.cy  – Not-for-profit organisations.
 pro.cy  – Professional organizations.
 name.cy  – Natural persons.
 ekloges.cy  – Organizations or persons related to elections.
 tm.cy  – Officially registered trademarks.
 ltd.cy  – Private and public limited companies.
 biz.cy  – Any other registered company.
 press.cy  – Organizations and entities connected to the press.
 parliament.cy  – The Parliament of Cyprus and associated entities.
 com.cy  – Commercial entities (unrestricted registration for Cypriot entities).
 centralbank.cy  – Central Bank of Cyprus
 mil.cy  – Ministry of Defence

External links
 IANA .cy whois information
 .cy NIC
 .cy domain registry website
 .cy domain registration agreement with terms and conditions

Country code top-level domains
Communications in Cyprus
Internet in Cyprus
Council of European National Top Level Domain Registries members
Computer-related introductions in 1994

sv:Toppdomän#C